Woronin is a surname. Notable people with the surname include:

 Marian Woronin (born 1956), Polish athlete
 Mikhail Stepanovich Woronin (1838–1903), Russian biologist